The 2017 Johnsonville 180 was the 23rd stock car race of the 2017 NASCAR Xfinity Series season, and the eighth iteration of the event. The race was held on Sunday, August 27, 2017, in Elkhart Lake, Wisconsin at Road America, a 4.048 miles (6.515 km) permanent road course. The race took the scheduled 45 laps to complete. Jeremy Clements, driving for his family owned team, Jeremy Clements Racing, came home with the upset win, after an exciting battle with Matt Tifft. With two laps to go, Clements and Tifft collided, causing them to both spin out. Clements was able to get in front of Tifft, and would lead the last lap for his first career NASCAR Xfinity Series win. Tifft would end up finishing in 3rd, with Michael Annett finishing in 2nd.

Background 
The race was held at Road America, which is a motorsport road course located near Elkhart Lake, Wisconsin, United States on Wisconsin Highway 67. It has hosted races since the 1950s and currently hosts races in the NASCAR Cup and Xfinity Series, WeatherTech SportsCar Championship, IndyCar Series, SCCA Pirelli World Challenge, ASRA, AMA Superbike series, and SCCA Pro Racing's Trans-Am Series.

Entry list 

 (R) denotes rookie driver.
 (i) denotes driver who is ineligible for series driver points.

Practice

First practice 
The first 55-minute practice session was held on Saturday, August 26, at 1:00 PM CST.

Final practice 
The final 55-minute practice session was held on Saturday, August 26, at 3:00 PM CST.

Qualifying 
Qualifying was scheduled to be held on Sunday, August 27, at 10:45 AM EST, but was cancelled due to inclement weather. The starting lineup would be based on a competition-based formula. As a result, Austin Cindric, driving for Team Penske, would earn the pole for the race.

No one would fail to qualify for the race.

Full starting lineup

Race results 
Stage 1 Laps: 10

Stage 2 Laps: 10

Stage 3 Laps: 25

Standings after the race 

Drivers' Championship standings

Note: Only the first 12 positions are included for the driver standings.

References 

2017 NASCAR Xfinity Series
NASCAR races at Road America
August 2017 sports events in the United States
2017 in sports in Wisconsin